The American Side is a 2016 mystery film directed by Jenna Ricker and starring Greg Stuhr and Matthew Broderick.

Premise
After a death at Niagara Falls, a seedy Buffalo private detective unravels a secret plot to build a powerful device conceived by inventor Nikola Tesla.

References

External links

2016 films
American police detective films
2010s English-language films
American mystery films
Films scored by David Shire
2010s American films
2010s mystery films